North Carolina Agricultural Experiment Station Cottage, also known as College Station and Hezouri House, is a historic home located at Raleigh, North Carolina.  It built in 1886 to house the residence and office of the North Carolina Agricultural Experiment Station,  It is a two-story, frame farmhouse with elements of Gothic Revival, Italianate, and Queen Anne style architecture.  It has a cross-gable roof and features sawnwork decoration on the front porch and gables.  The building housed the first agricultural experiment station in North Carolina.  The station closed in 1926, and it was subsequently used as a residence.

It was listed on the National Register of Historic Places in 2001.

References 

Agricultural research
Houses on the National Register of Historic Places in North Carolina
Gothic Revival architecture in North Carolina
Italianate architecture in North Carolina
Queen Anne architecture in North Carolina
Houses completed in 1886
Houses in Raleigh, North Carolina
National Register of Historic Places in Raleigh, North Carolina